Operation Miracle may also refer to:

 Operation Miracle (Rhodesia), 1979 operation in Mozambique
 Operation Miracle (1995), operation of Bosnian mujahideen
 Operation Miracle (2021), South Korean rescue operation in Afghanistan
 Operación Milagro, Cuban government's medical humanitarian mission